Brian Humphries may refer to:

 Brian Humphries (aviation), former president and CEO of the European Business Aviation Association
 Brian Humphries (IT businessman), CEO of Cognizant